Polish Water polo Championships is an annual Water polo competition organised by the Polish Swimming Federation(PZP), which serves as the Polish national championship for the sport.

First water polo championships in Poland were organized in 1925. Despite being really rare even a few years ago, this sport is at the moment getting more and more popular all around Poland. First, historic champion was Jutrzenka Krakow. Currently, the champion is Arkonia Szczecin.

Water polo champions of Poland 
1933 - EKS Katowice,
1934 - EKS Katowice,
1935 - EKS Katowice,
1936 - EKS Katowice,
1937 - EKS Katowice,
1938 - TP Katowice-Giszowiec,
1939 - TP Katowice-Giszowiec,
1940-1945 - no championships,
1946 - KSZO Ostrowiec,
1947 - Polonia Bytom,
1948 - KSZO Ostrowiec,
1949 - Elektryczność Warszawa,
1950 - Polonia Bytom,
1951 - no championships,
1952 - Cracovia Krakow,
1953 - Legia Warszawa,
1954 - Legia Warszawa,
1955 - Legia Warszawa,
1956 - Legia Warszawa,
1957 - Legia Warszawa,
1958 - Legia Warszawa,
1958 - Legia Warszawa,
1959 - Polonia Bytom,
1960 - Legia Warszawa,
1961 - Legia Warszawa,
1962 - Legia Warszawa,
1963 - Legia Warszawa,
1964 - Polonia Bytom,
1965 - Legia Warszawa,
1966 - Arkonia Szczecin,
1967 - Arkonia Szczecin,
1968 - Arkonia Szczecin,
1969 - Arkonia Szczecin,
1970 - Arkonia Szczecin,
1971 - Arkonia Szczecin,
1972 - KSZO Ostrowiec,
1973 - KSZO Ostrowiec,
1974 - Arkonia Szczecin,
1975 - Arkonia Szczecin,
1976 - Arkonia Szczecin,
1977 - Stilon Gorzów Wielkopolski,
1978 - Stilon Gorzów Wielkopolski,
1979 - Arkonia Szczecin,
1980 - Stilon Gorzów Wielkopolski,
1981 - Stilon Gorzów Wielkopolski,
1982 - Stilon Gorzów Wielkopolski,
1983 - Stilon Gorzów Wielkopolski,
1984 - Stilon Gorzów Wielkopolski,
1985 - Stilon Gorzów Wielkopolski,
1986 - Stilon Gorzów Wielkopolski,
1987 - Stilon Gorzów Wielkopolski,
1988 - Stilon Gorzów Wielkopolski,
1989 - Stilon Gorzów Wielkopolski,
1990 - Stilon Gorzów Wielkopolski,
1991 - Stilon Gorzów Wielkopolski,
1992 - Anilana Łódź,
1993 - Anilana Łódź,
1994 - KSZO Ostrowiec,
1995 - KSZO Ostrowiec,
1996 - Stilon Goróow Wielkopolski,
1997 - KSZO Ostrowiec,
1998 - KSZO Ostrowiec,
1999 - Anilana Łódź,
2000 - Anilana Łódź,
2001 - KSZO Ostrowiec,
2002 - LSTW Łódź,
2003 - LSTW Lodz,
2004 - LSTW Lodz,
2005 - LSTW Lodz,
2006 - LSTW Lodz,
2007 - LSTW Lodz,
2008 - Arkonia Szczecin.
2009 - LSTW Lodz
2010 - LSTW Lodz
2011 - LSTW Lodz
2012 - Arkonia Szczecin
2013 - LSTW Lodz
2014 - ŁSTW Łódź
2015 - ŁSTW Łódź
2016 - Arkonia Szczecin

Sources 
pilkawodna.waw.pl

Poland
Water polo competitions in Poland